The Tarkwa mine is one of the largest gold mines in the Ghana and in the world. The mine is located in the south-west of the country in the Western Region. The mine has estimated reserves of 15.1 million oz of gold.

Environmental, Social & Corporate Governance 
In October 2001 a tailings dam ruptured at the company's Tarkwa Gold Mine in Ghana resulting in thousands of cubic metres of mine waste water spilling into the Asuman River and resulting in the death of significant marine life. While acknowledging the cyanide spill the company stated at the time that the spill did not affect human health or safety.

A further incident occurred in 2003 when water from an abandoned underground mine shaft was identified as having seeped into the Asuman River sparking further fears of contamination.

In July 2012 the mine was directed by the Ghana Environmental Protection Agency to halt a gold-recovery plant because water discharged from the site required additional treatment.

References 

Gold mines in Ghana
Gold Fields